Den döende dandyn ("The dying dandy") is the seventh studio album by Swedish pop and rock artist Magnus Uggla. It was released in 1986. The album was awarded a Rockbjörnen award in the category "Swedish record of the year". "Herr servitör" is a cover of Nick Gilder's "Worlds Collide", with new unrelated lyrics in Swedish. The song "Joey Killer" mocks the glam metal subculture, which gained much popularity during the middle to late 1980s. Den döende dandyn peaked at number one on the Swedish Albums Chart.

Track listing
All songs written by Magnus Uggla, except where noted.
Side one
 "Staffans matematik" 4:53
 "Joey Killer" 4:29
 "Rumpnissar" 5:02
 "Varje gång jag ser dig" 4:58
Side two
 "Fula gubbar" 4:17 (Uggla, G.P. Telemann)
 "Herr servitör (Worlds Collide)" 4:50 (Uggla, James McCulloch, Nick Gilder)
 "Mattläggar-Oves hjulsång" 4:16
 "Passionsfrukt" 3:49
 "Den döende dandyn" 4:07

Note: The chorus of the song "Fula Gubbar" is inspired by a choral work from Georg Philipp Telemann.

Personnel
Magnus Uggla: Main Vocal
Henrik Jansson: Guitars
Peter Ljung: Bass, Keyboards
Per Lindwall: Drums, Percussion, Drum Programming
Staffan Birkenfalk, Benna Sörman, Nysse Nyström: Vocal Backing and Choir
RSO: Strings, String Arrangements

Production
Arranged and Produced by Peter Ljung and Anders Henriksson
Recording and Mix by Kaj Erixon
All songs published by Uggly Music, except track 6 (EMI Music Publishing Sweden)

Charts

Certifications

References 

1986 albums
Magnus Uggla albums